Petré may refer to:

 Gio Petré, a Swedish film actress
 Henrik Petré, a Swedish B.Sc. in sports science and former professional ice hockey player